"Spastik" is an instrumental track by British-Canadian electronic musician and DJ Richie Hawtin, under his alias Plastikman. It was released on 4 october 1993 in Canada. It is his most well-known production and considered a classic in techno. It is the first single from his Recycled Plastik EP.

Background 
"Spastik" is based on a nine-minute whirlwind of Roland TR-808 percussion. Hawtin often made it a centerpiece of his live performances.

Critical reception 
Jason Birchmeier of AllMusic wrote that "Spastik" "is downright staggering, especially when Hawtin unleashes the monstrous bass drum kicks after several minutes of slow buildup."

Impact and legacy 
It was voted by Mixmag readers as the seventh "Greatest Dance Record of All Time" in 2013.

Track listing 
12-inch single / CD maxi single, Canada / UK (1993)
 "Spastik" - 9:22
 "Helicopter" - 6:36
 "Gak" (Remix) - 6:51

12-inch single re-issue, Canada (2002)
 "Spastik" - 9:19
 "Slak" / "Kriket" (Live at Spastik 1994) - 7:22
 "Gak" (Remix) - 6:25

Charts

References

External links
 

1993 singles
Techno songs